Deh-e Malek (also Romanized as Deh Malek; also known as Malek and Malik) is a village in Rayen Rural District, Rayen District, Kerman County, Kerman Province, Iran. At the 2006 census, its population was 233, in 51 families.

References 

Populated places in Kerman County